Basim Elkarra is a civil rights leader serving as the director of the Sacramento chapter of the Council on American-Islamic Relations (CAIR), former board member of the Sacramento chapter of the American Civil Liberties Union, and serves on the Executive Board of the California Democratic Party.  He also was recently elected to the Twin Rivers Unified School District Board of Trustees in California, United States.

Personal life
Elkarra was born and raised in San Francisco, CA. He attended San Francisco City College and the University of California, Berkeley where he graduated with High Honors with a B.A. in Political Science. He resides in Sacramento Valley since 2004.

Education Work
Elkarra serves as the Chair of the Los Rios Community College District's Bond Oversight committee. In this capacity, he oversees $200 million tax dollars in the modernization and repair of the Los Rios' campuses.

Civil Rights Work
Basim Elkarra has been the Executive Director of the Sacramento Valley chapter of the Council on American–Islamic Relations since 2004. He has often been interviewed by Sacramento media on the topic of Muslim civil rights.

In 2011, the United States Embassy sent Elkarra to England to meet young British Muslims as part of a strategy to promote civic engagement in England and promoting democracy in the Middle East.

Democratic Party
As a member of the California Democratic Party, Elkarra served as chair of the Affirmative Action Committee. He has engaged with the Sacramento Valley law enforcement agencies on affirmative action issues and cultural education.

Twin Rivers Unified School District Election
Elkarra is running for the vacant Area 5 seat of the Twin Rivers School Board to be held on May 12, 2015. He runs opposed by Sonja Cameron. This is a special election after the former school trustee Cortez Quinn resigned from the Area 5 seat, Sonja Cameron was swiftly appointed to the vacant seat. Some local community members alleged that it was unfair that Sonja Cameron was appointed to the seat without an election and signatures were collected for a special election which will take place on May 12, 2015. The election will cost the school district an estimated $113,000

Notable Endorsements

 The Sacramento Bee
 Twin Rivers United Educators
 Congressman Ami Bera
 Sacramento Mayor Pro Tem, Angelique Ashby
 Former State Senate President Darrell Steinberg
 State Senator Dr. Richard Pan
 Democractic Party of Sacramento County
 Los Rios College Federation of Teachers, Local 2279 AFT, AFL-CIO
 Sacramento Central Labor Council, AFL-CIO
 Sacramento-Sierra's Building & Construction Trades Council
 Women Democrats of Sacramento County
 Latino Democratic Club of Sacramento County
 Georgette Imura, California Commission on Teacher Credentialing
 California Insurance Commissioner Dave Jones
 California State Controller Betty Yee
 California State Treasurer John Chiang
 Assemblymember Kevin McCarty
 Assemblymember Jim Cooper
 Assemblymember Ken Cooley
 Sacramento City Councilmember Steve Hansen
 Sacramento City Councilmember Rick Jennings

Controversy
In 2006, FrontPage Magazine journalist Joe Kaufman, convinced Senator Barbara Boxer to withdraw a "certificate of accomplishment" that she had previously awarded to CAIR official Basim Elkarra. Kaufman cited CAIR's alleged ties to Hamas and extreme statements supposedly perpetrated by Elkarra which he refuted. Boxer “expressed concern” about some past statements and actions by CAIR, and some law enforcement officials asserted that CAIR “gives aid to international terrorist groups.” CAIR nor any of its leaders have ever been indicted nor convicted of any crime. Following these events, Elkarra stated that "It is disappointing that [Sen. Boxer] has succumbed to these extremists." This revocation was strongly criticized by several organizations including the American Civil Liberties Union and the California Council of Churches. CAIR officials denied that CAIR had any links to terrorist groups and that the accusations leveled at them were motivated by Islamophobia. As a result of the controversy Boxer created, Basim received hate mail, including a death threat, since the controversy erupted.

Similarly, in 2010, Ami Bera who was running for a U.S. congress seat, returned $250 of campaign donations to Mr. Elkarra after questions about CAIR's affiliations. Bera was criticized because he "succumbed to the growing national hysteria about Islam in America and the NRCC's fear-mongering, in particular." On April 25, 2015, Ami Bera announced his endorsement for Basim Elkarra's campaign for the Twin Rivers School Board seat.

In 2017, Basim Elkarra received special thanks from the Jewish Federation of the Sacramento Region for getting an apology from Davis Imam Ammar Shahin after the Imam asked god to "destroy those who closed the Al-Aqsa Mosque" in a Friday sermon.

References

Living people
University of California, Berkeley alumni
California Democrats
Politicians from Sacramento, California
Year of birth missing (living people)